Aphylla angustifolia, the broad-striped forceptail, is a species of clubtail in the family of dragonflies known as Gomphidae. It is found in Central America and North America.

The IUCN conservation status of Aphylla angustifolia is "LC", least concern, with no immediate threat to the species' survival.

References

Further reading

 

Gomphidae
Articles created by Qbugbot
Insects described in 1986